</noinclude>

Yola (Fulfulde: Ƴoola), meaning 'Great Plain' or 'Vast Plain Land', is the largest city, capital city and administrative center of Adamawa State, Nigeria. Located on the Benue River, it has a population of 336,648 (2010). Yola is splited into two parts. The old town of Yola where the Lamido resides is the traditional city but the new city of Jimeta (about 5 km NW) is the administrative and commercial centre. Generally the term Yola is now used to mean both.

To the north are the Mandara Mountains and to the south are the Shebshi Mountains which Mount Dimlang (Vogel Peak) is part of.

Yola is an access point to the Gashaka Gumpti Nature Reserve, which is the largest national park in Nigeria, the Ngel Nyaki montane forest reserve, the Mambilla Plateau, the Sukur UNESCO World heritage site, which is Africa's first cultural landscape to receive World Heritage List inscription, the Yadin Waterfalls, the Kiri Dam on the Gongola River, the Benue national park in nearby Cameroon, the Waza National Park, and the Cameroonian town of Garoua, which lies across the border, on the Benue river.

History
Established in 1841, Yola is a municipality that sprawls across the hillside of this North-Eastern region of Nigeria. It was the capital of a Fulani state until it was taken over by the British in 1901. Today, it is the capital of Adamawa State, which was formed in 1991 from part of Gongola State. Modibbo Adama, a local chief of the Fulani, founded Yola in 1841. During the Islamic movement led by Shehu Usman Dan Fodio in the early 19th Century, Modibbo Adama was recognised as a learned Muslim who could lead the people in the Upper Benue area. Probably the first European to visit the area was Heinrich Barth in 1851, shortly after Yola was founded. He traveled by the Sahara route, coming through Kukawa near Lake Chad, which at the time was the capital of the Borno Empire.

Yola has the first airport in Nigeria as well as first town to have electricity. On 17 November 2015, a suicide bombing killed over 30 people.

Climate
Yola has a tropical savanna climate that borders on a hot semi-arid climate (Aw bordering on BSh according to the Köppen climate classification) with a dry season and a wetter season. The highest temperatures occur in March and April, just before the wet season starts.

Yola receives  of precipitation annually on average. There is a wetter season from May to October and a dry season for the rest of the year. The dry season, especially from February to April, has higher daytime temperatures and can have lower nighttime lows. The dry season also has a higher diurnal temperature variation. August is the wettest month, receiving  of rain on average over 16 precipitation days. No precipitation falls from December to February. Humidity is low in the dry season, dropping to just 13.5% in February, but it can get quite humid during the wet season, especially from July to September. Yola receives 2845.5 hours of sunshine annually, which is well-distributed throughout the year, with November having the most sunshine and August having the least.

Infrastructure
The nearby town of Jimeta has a market, zoo, an airport with direct flights to Saudi Arabia, NiPost and NiTel offices as well as the main mosque and cathedral. Being a state capital, it is a major transport hub with buses and taxis heading north to Mubi and Maiduguri, west to Numan, Gombe, jalingo and Bauchi and south to Makurdi and Katsina Ala. Taxis are available to Garoua in Cameroon. There is an airport with regular flights to Abuja and Lagos. The town is home to various institutions of learning, such as the: American University of Nigeria (AUN) (which is Africa's first and only development university), Adamawa State Polytechnic, The Modibbo Adama University Yola (MAU) previously known as Federal University of Technology, Yola, located about 10 km north of the city on the road to Mubi, The Federal Government Girls College, Yola, AUN Academy (ABTI Academy), Aliyu Mustapha Academy, Chiroma Ahmad Academy, Ahmadu Ribadu College, MAUTECH university secondary school, Concordia College (which was nominated as the best post primary school of the year 2007 by the National Association of Nigerian Students). Yola also houses one of the six campuses of the Nigerian Law school  located beside the American University of Nigeria and many other educational institutions. Adamawa has one of the best depots in Nigeria, located about 5 km west on the road to Numan. Tourist sites include: the Three sister hills in Song Local Government Area, which are three scenic rock formations standing side by side at different height with the middle one as the big sister, The former Njuwa lake fishing festival site which is now dried and developed into residential area, The Lamido's Palace and the Annual horse-riding durbar. originally a Fulbe settlement, the town is largely dominated by Fulbe, as well as people from other parts of the country and the neighboring country of Cameroon.

See also
 Ahmadu Ribadu College
 Adamawa State Polytechnic

Notable people
 Mohammed Barkindo

References

Populated places in Adamawa State
State capitals in Nigeria